Hajji Morad may refer to:

Hajji Morad, Delfan, Lorestan Province
Hajji Morad, Kuhdasht, Lorestan Province
Hajji Morad, Yazd